Baysarovo (Baysar) is a rural locality (a village) in Voyadinsky Selsoviet, Yanaulsky District, Bashkortostan, Russia. The population was 5 as of 2010. There are 2 streets.

Geography 
Baysarovo is located 59 km northwest of Yanaul (the district's administrative centre) by road. Burenka is the nearest rural locality.

References 

Rural localities in Yanaulsky District